The Port Gibson Oil Works Mill Building is a historic industrial building for production of cottonseed oil located in Port Gibson, Mississippi, United States. Beginning operations in 1882, it is one of the earliest cottonseed crushing mills in the U.S. The two-story, brick mill building was still in operation as of 1979. Major parts of the interior machinery had been modernized in 1930 and 1955.

The building was entered on the National Register of Historic Places in 1979.

See also
National Register of Historic Places listings in Claiborne County, Mississippi

References

External links

, National Register of Historic Places cover documentation

Industrial buildings completed in 1882
1882 establishments in Mississippi
National Register of Historic Places in Claiborne County, Mississippi
Industrial buildings and structures on the National Register of Historic Places in Mississippi
Port Gibson, Mississippi
Cotton production
Cottonseed oil
Cotton industry in the United States